Ecclesine is a surname. Notable people with the surname include:

Patrick Ecclesine, American photographer
Thomas C. E. Ecclesine (1846–1895), American lawyer and politician